Bike Aid is a German UCI Continental team founded in 2012, that participates in UCI Continental Circuits races.

Team roster

Major wins

2014
 Overall Tour du Cameroun, Dan Craven
Stage 5, Daniel Bichlmann
 Overall Grand Prix Chantal Biya, Mekseb Debesay
Stage 4, Mekseb Debesay
Stages 1 & 6 Tour du Rwanda, Mekseb Debesay
2015
Stage 4 Vuelta a la Independencia Nacional, Yannick Mayer
 Overall, Tour de Blida, Mekseb Debesay
Stage 1, Mekseb Debesay
Critérium International de Sétif, Mekseb Debesay
Stage 3 Tour International de Sétif, Mekseb Debesay
Stage 8 Tour du Faso, Mekseb Debesay
Stages 1 & 4 Tour du Rwanda, Mekseb Debesay
2016
Stage 5 Tour du Cameroun, Jean Bosco Nsengimana
Stage 2 Tour of Eritrea, Meron Teshome
Stage 4 Grand Prix Chantal Biya, Jean Bosco Nsengimana
2017
African Continental Time Trial Championships, Meron Teshome
 Overall Tour du Cameroun, Nikodemus Holler
Stage 2, Nikodemus Holler
Stages 3 & 5, Meron Teshome
Stages 1 & 3 Tour of Eritrea, Meron Teshome
Stage 3 Tour of Ukraine, Tino Thömel
2018
Stage 1 La Tropicale Amissa Bongo, Lucas Carstensen
Stage 3 Sharjah International Cycling Tour, Salim Kipkemboi
Stage 5 Rás Tailteann, Lucas Carstensen
Stages 4 & 5 Tour de Hongrie, Nikodemus Holler
Stage 2 Tour of Hainan, Lucas Carstensen
Stage 6 Tour de Singkarak, Clint Hendricks
Stage 8 Tour de Singkarak, Nikodemus Holler
2019
Grand Prix Alanya, Lucas Carstensen
 Overall Tour of Mersin, Peter Koning
Stage 2, Aaron Grosser
Stage 3, Peter Koning
2020
Prologue Sibiu Cycling Tour, Nikodemus Holler
Prologue Tour of Romania, Justin Wolf
Stage 2 Tour of Romania, Lucas Carstensen
 Overall Tour of Thailand, Nikodemus Holler
Stages 2 & 5, Lucas Carstensen
2021
Stage 1 Tour of Mevlana, Justin Wolf
Stage 1 Belgrade Banjaluka, Justin Wolf
Stage 6 Tour de Bretagne, Justin Wolf
Stages 1, 2, 4 & 5 Tour of Thailand, Lucas Carstensen
Stage 6 Tour of Thailand, Adne van Engelen

References

External links

UCI Continental Teams (Europe)
Cycling teams based in Germany
Cycling teams established in 2012
2012 establishments in Germany